Walther Süssenguth (February 8, 1900 - April 28, 1964) was a German actor.

Filmography

External links

1900 births
1964 deaths
People from Schleiz
People from the Principality of Reuss-Gera
German male film actors
20th-century German male actors